Sydney New Year's Eve is an annual New Year's Eve fireworks event in Sydney, New South Wales, Australia. The event currently consists of two fireworks shows, with an evening display known as the "Family Fireworks" held at 9:00 p.m. AEDT, and the main "Midnight Fireworks" held at 12:00 a.m. Fireworks are launched from barges in Port Jackson, as well as nearby landmarks such as the Sydney Opera House, and the Sydney Harbour Bridge—which serves as the main focal point of the show via lighting and pyrotechnic effects.

As one of the first major cities to celebrate the New Year, the event is widely-viewed in Australia and worldwide. Organizers have estimated the annual in-person attendance of the event to be around 1.5 to 1.6 million, with tourists accounting for a large portion of its attendees. Some locations, such as the Royal Botanic Garden, host ticketed seating areas.

The event is usually organized by the city; as of 2020, the state of New South Wales was given "temporary custodianship" of the event.

History

Origins
In 1976, the Sydney Committee decided to reconstitute a failing Waratah Festival as the Festival of Sydney. At the first meeting of its Programme Committee, they agreed that New Year's Eve should launch the new festival, a 'big bang affair'. Focusing on the harbour and adjacent areas, it would include a sail-past of decorated craft, music, and a 'spectacular fireworks display at midnight'. With this, the Festival of Sydney made New Year's Eve official for the first time. Stephen Hall was its Executive Director from 1977 to 1994. The 1979/80 brochure for the Festival featured an image of the fireworks over the Sydney Opera House and the slogan "Get into the '80s with a bang".

Inspiration to use the Sydney Harbour Bridge as a launchpad for fireworks came from the use of fireworks on the Brooklyn Bridge as part of its 100th anniversary celebrations in 1983.

Syd Howard, pyrotechnician, used his inspiration and the chances given to him to put fireworks displays on Sydney Harbour to use the bridge as a launchpad for fireworks. His first opportunity was in 1986 for the 75th Anniversary Review of the Royal Australian Navy. Here he introduced the "waterfall" effect as well as a pyrotechnic message on the bridge. The message read "NSW salutes Royal Australian Navy" and employed thousands of cigarette-style fireworks to create the lettering. It hung over the side of the pedestrian walkway.

From NYE 1996 to NYE 1999, management of the event was contracted out to Ric Birch's Spectak Productions. Birch, known for his work on numerous Olympic Games Opening and Closing Ceremonies brought with him former Jimmy and the Boys frontman Ignatius Jones as Creative Director and Catriona Brown as Senior Producer.

1996–1999
The original Sydney New Year's Eve fireworks display (NYE 1996) was designed by Syd Howard Fireworks. The event used the pylons, arch and catwalk of the bridge, city buildings and one barge located in front of the Sydney Opera House. There was a ten-second pyrotechnic countdown. Each second, one shooting comet shot off a different building starting from North Sydney and finishing at AMP Tower to form an Olympic Torch to welcome in 1997.

For NYE 1997, the Midnight Fireworks included the Star City Casino. The AMP Tower turned into a ticking clock with shooting comets slowly rotating around the top of the tower. The soundtrack for the countdown was a ticking clock before a bell toll rang in 1999. This bell toll also turned AMP Tower into an Olympic Torch. Also, from NYE 1997, the Midnight Fireworks were extended to include the Harbour Bridge, the 9 pm Family Fireworks were extended to include two barges (one on each side of the bridge) and the displays were co-designed by Foti International Fireworks and Syd Howard Fireworks.

On NYE 1999 the Apollo 11 countdown, as well as air raid sirens provided the soundtrack for the countdown. A smiley face was visible on the bridge during the show, until the finale revealed the word "Eternity" in Copperplate writing, in honour of Arthur Stace. Fireworks were also launched from the Centrepoint Tower. A rather unusual feature of the 1999 display was a selection of tugboats that made their way through the harbour, each one carrying a colourful, brightly lit model of a particular sea creature. The Fireworks Soundtrack included a five-minute "History Of Pop" featuring hits from the 1890s to the 1990s.

2000–2004
Since 2000, the displays have been fully designed and created by Foti International Fireworks. During NYE 2000, a larger than life birthday cake was unveiled well before midnight to celebrate 100 years of Australia as a nation. It was placed in front of the northern forecourt of the Opera House on a pontoon. At midnight, the cake lit up with a chasing lighting effect running from the bottom of the cake to the top. A Federation Star representing 100 years since the federation of Australia appeared on the bridge during the finale.

On NYE 2001, A dove of peace slowly came into view to speak peace to the world after the September 11th terrorist attacks in New York. On NYE 2002, the city buildings were removed from the fireworks displays. Those fireworks were then rescheduled to Australia Day, but were cancelled again, this time due to a total fire ban. An animated dove appeared on the bridge during the finale.

After six years as creative director, Ignatius Jones stepped down in 2002 to be replaced by former Melbourne and Sydney Festival artistic director Leo Schofield. Ken Wilby moved on the following year with the event's production manager Ed Wilkinson elevated to the producer role from 2003 to 2005.

On NYE 2003, a fifteen-second countdown was accompanied with the striking of a gong at midnight. For the first time, fireworks were launched off the vertical hangers of the bridge in a one-off display. From NYE 2004, the first 3D bridge effect was used. Also in that year, the fireworks display was viewed as a disco with pop music and a disco ball suspended from the bridge.

2005–2009
On NYE 2005, a beating heart was the icon on the bridge that appeared after the 9 pm fireworks display. The fireworks themselves during the show exploded in Heart shapes. Former Sydney Theatre Company head Wayne Harrison joined Katrina Marton in taking over leadership of the event as Creative Director and Producer respectively for the events from 2005 to 2007.

NYE 2006 saw the four barges feature for the 9 pm Family Fireworks while six barges feature with the city buildings return for the midnight show and in addition, it had a ten-second countdown projected on the pylons starting with the logo for Network 10. A question mark was shown in the nights leading up to the celebrations, which also doubled up as the curved end of the coat hanger.

In NYE 2007, the bridge acted as a seventh barge for the first time shooting fireworks throughout the show instead of just during the beginning and finale.

In NYE 2008, the bridge, seven city buildings and six barges staged in the biggest fireworks display yet, increasing from $4 million worth of fireworks to $5 million. Brenton Kewley, who had worked on the event since 1996 in various roles, including Art Director and Associate Producer took over as Producer for the 2008 and 2009 events while journalist and broadcaster Rhoda Roberts took over from Wayne Harrison in 2008.

During NYE 2009, the countdown started with messages projected on the pylons. The pyrotechnic countdown was started by launching an exploding mine on a barge in front of the bridge. For the first time, microchip fireworks were used in the show which lasted longer in the sky and were more accurate when synchronised with music. The show consisted of $5 million worth of fireworks running for twelve minutes. A Yin Yang symbol appeared on the bridge during the finale. Once again, more fireworks exploded on the bridge throughout the entire show when compared with previous NYE displays.

2010–2014
On NYE 2010, the creative direction was still Rhoda Roberts. The theme was "Make Your Mark", reflecting on the decade gone and the lasting impressions left by our actions; as well as reflecting on ways in which all people can make their mark by contributing to a better future. For the very first time the bridge effect was multi-layered, which included more than ten signs and symbols.

In 2011, Aneurin Coffey took over as Producer having been Production Manager since 2006. 2011 also saw a change from individual creative directors to a creative agency, Imagination Australia, which promoted Marc Newson as creative spokesperson. The theme was "Time to Dream". The display, for the very first time, was choreographed to an all-Australian soundtrack created by music production house s:amplify which included original composition. This marks the first year, a ninety-second countdown was featured on the bridge effect.

On NYE 2012, the logo featured a swirl of coloured sails in magenta, yellow, purple and red, and marked with Kylie Minogue's signature "K". The show included new effects such as bees, koalas and octopus shells. A ten-second countdown accompanied by comets launched from jet skis before midnight. The show's budget has increased from $6.3 million to $6.6 million. Kylie Minogue was appointed as creative ambassador for the 2012 celebrations. Kylie worked alongside s:amplify to create the soundtrack including an exclusive remix created for the finale.

On NYE 2013, fireworks launched from the Opera House celebrating its 40th anniversary in the midnight fireworks and once again, city buildings were removed from the family and midnight shows. The bridge effect was also twice as big than in previous years and used new LED technology. Reg Mombassa was creative ambassador for 2013/14.

The theme for the 2014–15 edition was "Inspire"; the budget was reported to have increased from $6.8 million to $7.2 million, and Australian actor Jack Thompson was named the "creative ambassador" for the show. As part of the theme, viewers were encouraged to post messages on Twitter using the hashtag "#SydNYE" for a chance to have them projected on the bridge pylons, while there was also a third, short fireworks show between the family and midnight shows known as the "inspire moment". The bridge effect was a stylised lightbulb, in honour of the United Nations' declaration of 2015 as the International Year of Light. In acknowledgement of the Lindt Cafe siege, the message "Sydney remembers" was occasionally projected on the pylons.

2015–2019

The 2015–16 theme was "City of Colour". For the first time, a welcome to country ceremony was held at sundown prior to the 9 pm show, to acknowledge the harbour as territory of the Cadigal, Gamaragal, and Wangal bands of the Eora people. The new segment was designed to be "inclusive and fun" and leverage technology: it included projections of aboriginal imagery on the pylons, as well as lighting and pyrotechnic effects on the bridge that were inspired by the Australian Aboriginal Flag. For the first time since the practice was introduced, organisers eschewed the lit symbols that had been used as bridge effects, in favour of constructing a larger array of lighting effects utilising the entire bridge.

The 2016–17 theme was "Welcome to SydNYE"; co-producer Catherine Flanagan explained that the theme was about "welcoming everybody to this magical place", particularly tourists. A papercraft sculpture of the Sydney skyline by artist Benja Harney (which carried a florid appearance in honour of the 200th anniversary of the Royal Botanic Garden) was used as a visual motif across the entirety of the event. The welcome to country ceremony added a smoking ceremony conducted by the Tribal Warrior and Mari Nawi boats. Tributes to the musicians Prince and David Bowie were featured during the family and midnight shows respectively, inspired by their songs "Purple Rain" and "Space Oddity". The midnight show also featured a segment that paid tribute to actor Gene Wilder, with candy-shaped firecrackers in a reference to his portrayal of Willy Wonka.

The 2017–18 edition featured a total of eight tonnes of pyrotechnics, and a rainbow flag-coloured waterfall effect to pay tribute to the 40th anniversary of Sydney Mardi Gras, and the 9 December 2017 legalisation of same-sex marriage in Australia. The welcome to country ceremony included a special message from the Muwekma Ohlone community of northern California, in honour of the 50th anniversary of Sydney's sister city relationship with San Francisco.

The theme for 2018–19 was "The Pulse of Sydney", reflected by new pyrotechnic effects that "[pulsate] in dramatic new shapes", and colour effects that "[move] across the display rather than the traditional explosion from the centre of the firework". The show used 8.5 tonnes of pyrotechnics, and also contained a segment paying tribute to American singer Aretha Franklin (who died in August 2018).

Ahead of the 2019–20 edition, organisers unveiled a new visual identity and branding for the event (in place of an annual theme) designed by Garbett Design.

There were calls to cancel the fireworks due to the extreme bushfires across the country, with a petition proposing for their budget to be reallocated to disaster relief purposes. The fires had prompted cancellations and postponements of fireworks celebrations in other areas. The City of Sydney stated that the fireworks would go on as scheduled, but that "if a total fire ban is declared, we will continue to liaise with NSW Government agencies and the NSW Rural Fire Service to determine the safest way to proceed with the event". Fireworks director Fortunato Foti was to also be consulted in the event of high winds. The Rural Fire Service, which granted an exemption to the fire ban for the show, stated that it did not expect "catastrophic" conditions to return on New Year's Eve. Highs of 40°C (104°F) were forecast for western Sydney, and special air quality statements were issued in relation to the event.

Sydney officials stated that it would be infeasible to cancel the show, as it would be disruptive to tourists and local business, much of the budget had already been spent, and that there would be "little practical benefit for affected communities". The event's head of audience Tanya Goldberg added that an Australian Red Cross charity appeal would be promoted throughout the event and telecast. Goldberg explained that "the one thing that will help those communities is to go ahead with the event and leverage the power of it to drive people to donate".

2020–present

2020–21: COVID-19 impact 

Due to the COVID-19 pandemic in Australia, the 2020–21 edition was scaled back to consist only of a shortened, seven-minute fireworks display at midnight, with the Family Fireworks placed on hiatus. In an interview with 2GB on 24 September, Premier of New South Wales Gladys Berejiklian discussed plans for ticketed attendance at key vantage points for crowd control and social distancing reasons, and remarked of last year's event that Australians "felt relieved that we were still able to have a feeling of normalcy during what was otherwise a very difficult time."The City of Sydney reached an agreement with the state government to grant it "temporary custodianship" of Sydney New Year's Eve.

A two-stage perimeter was established within Sydney's central business district (CBD), Circular Quay, and North Sydney on the evening of the event, with the "yellow zone" being patrolled by police to break up large crowds that violate NSW health orders in regards to gatherings, and the "green zone" (in closer proximity to the harbour) having restricted access by permit only after 5:00 p.m. on New Year's Eve. Permits were only granted to local residents, those who had a confirmed reservation at a hospitality business within a green zone (such as a restaurant or hotel), and employees of businesses within the zone. 

To honour their involvement, plans were announced for certain "premium" viewing areas on the foreshore to be reserved exclusively to invited frontline workers. Premier Berejiklian scrapped the plan on 28 December amid new cases of community transmission in Greater Sydney (which had prompted a localised stay at home order for Sydney's Northern Beaches, and a tightening of restrictions on gatherings elsewhere), stating that there was "too much of a health risk having people from the regions and from Sydney and from broader regional areas congregate all in the CBD". She said that the state government would "find another opportunity during the year to recognise what [they] have done". It was eventually decided that major harbourfront viewing locations in the green zone would be closed to the public; residents were asked to watch the display on television at home instead. It was still possible to view the fireworks by boat in Sydney Harbour.

2021–22 

In September 2021, amid the Delta variant outbreak, it was reported that the City of Sydney had suspended the Family Fireworks for a second year in a row due to the uncertainty of holding mass gatherings; the decision faced criticism for having been done unilaterally without discussion from councillors and other stakeholders. On 2 October, it was reported that Lord Mayor Clover Moore had sent a letter to Minister of Tourism Stuart Ayres, stating that Sydney New Year's Eve would be held "in a similar way to prior to the pandemic", provided that the NSW government "intensify its critical contribution" to the event. She told The Sydney Morning Herald that "the state government has assured us it will take responsibility for the event or cancel the 9 p.m. fireworks should public health conditions deteriorate." The concerns that led to the initial cancellation included the turnover in audiences between the two shows, and the presence of younger spectators who cannot be vaccinated for COVID-19.

On 9 December 2021, organisers announced that the 2021–22 theme would be "See Sydney Shine", and that the midnight fireworks' soundtrack would be curated by electronic music duo The Presets. The Family Fireworks served as the welcome to country, and were curated by indigenous artist Blak Douglas. Moore stated that the theme would reflect "the beginning of what we hope will be an entirely new year for us, and for the world." Foti stated that the show would feature new effects to make the Harbour Bridge appear to be "dancing with colour", and a record 2,000 fireworks to be fired from the Sydney Opera House. For crowd control and contact tracing purposes, vantage points on the foreshore were ticketed. The number of areas requiring paid tickets expanded from "a few" in 2020 to 15, including the Royal Botanic Gardens and Barangaroo.

2022–23 

On 30 November 2022, organisers announced that the 2022–23 edition would be themed to diversity and inclusion and would feature eight tonnes of pyrotechnics with the city buildings being used to launch fireworks for the first time since the 2012–13 event. The midnight fireworks' soundtrack was created by Australian musician Stace Cadet featuring KLP and the 9:00 p.m. Calling Country fireworks featured a unique soundtrack by Indigenous artist Salllvage featuring Nadeena Dixon as a vocalist.

Bridge effect
Central to the firework displays each year since 1999 is the lighting display on the Harbour Bridge known as the "bridge effect". Made of rope light attached to a panel and truss system, the display showcased a variety of symbols and other images related to the current year's theme.

In recent times, the bridge has included a rope light display on a framework in the centre of the eastern arch, which is used to complement the fireworks. As the scaffolding and framework are clearly visible for some weeks before the event, revealing the outline of the design, there is much speculation as to how the effect is to be realised. The bridge effect has been designed by Brian Thomson since 2006, with the lighting designed by Mark Hammer since 2008. Since 2015, the current lighting designer is Ziggy Ziegler.

Waterfall effect

A continual stream of fireworks falling from the base of the bridge down to actually touch the water. The waterfall comprises approximately 1,100 candle fireworks. Each year, it has been a traditional golden waterfall.

Some years the waterfall effect has been changed such as on NYE 2000 when the waterfall changed colours from gold to silver. NYE 2000 was also unique in that fireworks were also fired for the first time from the gantry of the bridge.

NYE 2002 had a "strobing angelic" waterfall effect where 144 Roman candles released mines and stars that "twinkled". This effect was repeated on NYE 2005 where it changed colour from red to white and also on NYE 2006 where it was coloured only green.

NYE 2004 had the traditional golden waterfall effect except that it slowed crossed the bridge from south to north. This was a difficult set up due to the arch's access but a first of its kind on the bridge with a spectacular "torrent style" waterfall effect.

On NYE 2015 a waterfall with fireworks cascaded during the middle of the family fireworks display.

On NYE 2017 a rainbow waterfall cascaded from the Harbour Bridge during the midnight show, celebrating the legalisation of same-sex marriage in Australia. This was repeated on NYE 2022, celebrating Sydney hosting WorldPride in 2023.

The years where the traditional golden waterfall effect has not been featured completely are; NYE 2000 (golden to silver), NYE 2002 (green & white strobing angelic), NYE 2005 (red to white strobing angelic), and NYE 2006 (green strobing angelic).

The golden waterfall was to be used again on NYE 2018, however, it failed to ignite as programmed.
The waterfall was successfully used the following year on NYE 2019 to welcome in 2020.

For the first time since 2006, the traditional golden waterfall was briefly accompanied by a white strobing angelic waterfall for NYE 2020.

Broadcast
From 1996 to 2006, the rights to the television broadcast were held by the Nine Network with Richard Wilkins as a host for almost every year and Eddie McGuire for the 1999–2000 telecast. From 2006 to 2009, Network Ten was broadcaster after winning a three-year deal from Nine. In 2009, Nine regained the rights back from Ten until 2013. ABC, ABC HD, ABN and ABC Australia had the rights since 2013.

The City of Sydney put its Sydney New Year's Eve fireworks coverage to tender following the conclusion of ABC's two-year contract, with the broadcaster having continued as broadcaster since. The 2015 fireworks were the first to utilise drone-mounted cameras for additional angles, and since 2016, an official international webcast has been streamed on platforms such as Facebook.

Controversies

NYE 2004 soundtrack
A dance remix of Advance Australia Fair/Waltzing Matilda was composed by Hylton Mowday especially for the event. It was generally disliked by the public, along with Prime Minister John Howard, who criticized merging the two songs together, disallowing the usual public moment of the crowd singing Advance Australia Fair for a remix which could not be sung along to. Leader of the New South Wales Opposition, John Brogden, called it 'simply a bad piece of music', and that it was disrespectful to remix the national anthem.

ABC coverage
The ABC received complaints regarding its coverage in 2013/14; viewers cited unusual flirtations between presenters, including co-presenter Stephanie Brantz warning Lawrence Mooney to return to a serious focus. The following year's 2014/15 coverage was criticised for co-host Julia Zemiro being caught on a hot mic saying "oh, thank God" when the closing credits came on-screen. In 2015/16, the show's hashtag was used to complain about the ceremony (including calls for future years to return to Nine), though that year's pub quiz was praised, with viewers being complimentary of host Lawrence Mooney.

References

External links
 

 
Tourist attractions in Sydney
Australian Broadcasting Corporation specials
Nine Network specials
Network 10 specials
Recurring events established in 1996
Annual television shows
1996 establishments in Australia
1990s in Sydney
Sydney